is the debut single by Japanese band Antic Cafe. The songs are featured on the Amedama Rock album with songs from √69.  The song peaked at No. 75 on the Japanese singles chart.

Track listing

 "Candyholic" (キャンデーホリック) - 3:38
 "Mousou Aikouka" (妄想愛好家) - 4:27
 "3P" - 4:16

References

Candyholic
Candyholic
2004 songs
Loop Ash Records singles
Songs written by Kanon (bassist)